The A Files is an album by the punk band Sham 69, released in 1997.

Critical reception
AllMusic wrote that "though it's jumbled and baffling, this is a very sophisticated work for a gang of boot boys from Hersham."

Track listing
All songs by Dave Parsons

 "Blackpool" - 2:01
 "Geoffrey Thomas" - 3:09
 "Loudmouth" - 2:09
 "I'm Mad" - 3:02
 "14 Years" - 3:03
 "Mary's Sofa" - 2:58
 "Trainspotter" - 2:22
 "Studenthead" - 3:13
 "Windowstare" - 4:11
 "Sloanberg" - 2:21
 "Roxy Was a Tourist" - 2:58
 "Get a Life" - 2:45
 "Swampy" - 3:57
 "Tag 14" - instrumental - 6:20

Personnel
Sham 69
Jimmy Pursey - vocals, producer
Dave Guy Parsons - guitar, arranger
Mat Sargent - bass
Technical
Gordon Mills - producer
Bryan Adams - executive producer
Austin Haragin - front cover photography

References

1997 albums
Sham 69 albums